
Year 401 BC was a year of the pre-Julian Roman calendar. At the time, it was known as the Year of the Tribunate of Potitus, Cossus, Camillus, Ambustus, Mamercinus and Iullus (or, less frequently, year 353 Ab urbe condita). The denomination 401 BC for this year has been used since the early medieval period, when the Anno Domini calendar era became the prevalent method in Europe for naming years.

Events 
 By place 

 Persian empire 
 Cyrus the Younger uses a quarrel with Tissaphernes over the Ionian cities as a pretext for gathering a large army and also pretends to prepare an expedition to Pisidia, in the Taurus Mountains. Cyrus starts out with about 15,220 men, of whom 10,400 are Greek mercenaries. When he reaches the Euphrates River at Thapsacus, he announces that he is marching against Artaxerxes II. He advances unopposed into Babylonia; but Artaxerxes, warned at the last moment by Tissaphernes, hastily gathers an army. The two forces meet in the Battle of Cunaxa, north of Babylon, where Cyrus is slain.

 Greece 
 The Greek mercenaries fighting for Cyrus are left stranded after Cyrus' defeat. They fight their way north through hostile Persians, Armenians, and Kurds to Trapezus on the coast of the Black Sea under Xenophon, who becomes their leader when the satrap of Lydia, Tissaphernes, has Clearchus of Sparta and the other senior Greek captains captured and executed.
 Agesilaus II becomes king of Sparta on the death of his stepbrother Agis II.

 China 
 Zhou an wang becomes King of the Zhou Dynasty of China.

 By topic 

 Literature 
 Sophocles' tragic play Oedipus at Colonus is performed posthumously. It is produced by his grandson (also called Sophocles) at the Festival of Dionysus in Athens.

Births

Deaths 
 Agis II, Eurypontid king of Sparta
 Clearchus, Spartan general and mercenary
 Cyrus the Younger, younger son of Darius II, King of Persia

References